Mosedale is a hamlet and former civil parish, now in the parish of Mungrisdale in the Eden district, in the county of Cumbria, in the north west of the English Lake District. It is on the River Caldew, north east of Bowscale Fell and south east of Carrock Fell, about one mile north of Mungrisdale. In 1931 the parish had a population of 49. In the 2011 United Kingdom census the parish of Mungrisdale, comprising eight hamlets including Mosedale, had a population of 297.

There is a Quaker meeting house in Mosedale, where meetings are held weekly in summer and fortnightly in winter. The meeting house was created in 1702 from an earlier building, was used for regular meetings until 1865, became an Anglican chapel of ease 1936–1970, and was restored for use by Quakers in 1973. It is one of the earliest meeting houses in Cumbria and is associated with George Fox, the founder of the Quakers.

History 
Mosedale was formerly a township in Caldbeck parish, from 1866 Mosedale was a civil parish in its own right until it was abolished on 1 April 1934 and merged with Mungrisdale.

See also

Listed buildings in Mungrisdale

References

External links
 Cumbria County History Trust: Mosedale (nb: provisional research only – see Talk page)

Hamlets in Cumbria
Former civil parishes in Cumbria
Mungrisdale